Mads Enggård (born 20 January 2004) is a Danish professional footballer who plays for Danish Superliga club Randers FC as a midfielder.

Career

Randers FC
Enggård joined Randers FC as a U15 player from FC Midtjylland. He played his way up through the youth ranks and made his debut for Randers in the autumn of 2020 at the age of 16, when he came on in a Danish Cup game against Aarhus Fremad on 27 November 2020. He made one more appearance that season - also in a Danish Cup match - while sitting on the bench in four Danish Superliga matches.

In the 2021-22 season, Enggård's breakthrough began in earnest. After an appearance against Leicester City in the UEFA Europa Conference League in February 2022, he made his Danish Superliga debut on 4 March 2022 against FC Copenhagen. He made seven league appearances in that season.

On 25 August 2022, Enggård signed a new deal with Randers until June 2025.

References

External links

Mads Enggård at DBU

2004 births
Living people
Danish men's footballers
Association football midfielders
Denmark youth international footballers
People from Ringkøbing-Skjern Municipality
Sportspeople from the Region of Southern Denmark
FC Midtjylland players
Randers FC players
Danish Superliga players